The Sanying or Light Blue line (code LB) is a light metro line under construction in New Taipei, Taiwan. Approval for the construction of the line was given by the central government on 2 June 2015. Constructed on elevated tracks, the line will be 14.3 km long and will have 12 stations and one depot. It will run from Dingpu Station on the Bannan line along Zhongyang Road to Sanxia and then cross National Freeway No. 3 to Yingge. A turnkey contract was signed with Hitachi Rail STS and Hitachi Rail Italy as members of the ARH consortium on 21 June 2016. As leader of the consortium, Hitachi Rail STS's scope of work included the supply of train control technology and all the electromechanical systems for an equivalent value of €219.8 million (VAT excluded). Hitachi's scope of work included the design and manufacture of 29 two-car trains. The main project started construction on 21 July 2016 and is expected to be completed and opened to traffic by 2025. In addition to the main line, there is also a plan to extend the line to Bade District, Taoyuan. This 3.9 km extension would connect to the Green Line of the Taoyuan Metro.

Construction Progress
As of the end of August 2022, construction is 67.54% complete according to the Department of Rapid Transit Systems, New Taipei City Government.

Controversy
In August 2017, residents of Sanxia District protested against the planned station at Mazutian, citing controversy over land usage.

Stations

See also
 Rail transport in Taiwan
 List of railway stations in Taiwan
 Ankeng light rail
 Danhai light rail

Notes

References 

Proposed public transportation in Taiwan
Standard gauge railways in Taiwan